Tortol Lumanza Lembi (born 13 April 1994) is a Belgian footballer who plays for Norwegian club Hønefoss. He plays as a central midfielder.

Club career
Born in Antwerp, Lumanza joined Standard Liège in 2010 from Beerschot AC. During the 2013–14 season, he was loaned out to second division side Sint-Truiden. On 25 July 2014, he made his Belgian Pro League debut with Standard Liège against Charleroi. After a period without a club he joined Stabæk Fotball, a Tippeligaen team, in 2017.

International career
Lumanza was born in Belgium and is of Congolese descent. He is a former youth international for Belgium.

References

External links
 
 

Living people
1994 births
Footballers from Antwerp
Association football midfielders
Belgian footballers
Belgium youth international footballers
Belgian people of Democratic Republic of the Congo descent
Standard Liège players
Sint-Truidense V.V. players
S.K. Beveren players
Ankaraspor footballers
Belgian Pro League players
Challenger Pro League players
Süper Lig players
Belgian expatriate footballers
Stabæk Fotball players
Belgian expatriate sportspeople in Norway
Eliteserien players